Collins v. Yosemite Park & Curry Co., 304 U.S. 518 (1938), is a court case in which the appellee, the Yosemite Park and Curry Co., brought this suit to enjoin the California State Board of Equalization and the State Attorney General from enforcing the 'Alcoholic Beverage Control Act' of the State of California, within the limits of Yosemite National Park.

Supreme Court involvement
The court distinguished between the State's power under the Twenty-first Amendment to regulate the importation of liquor to the state, and its "territorial jurisdiction" over a federal enclave  like the park.

The court held that the sections of a California statute which levied excises on sales of liquor in Yosemite National Park were enforceable in the Park, while sections of the same statute providing regulation of the Park liquor traffic through licenses were unenforceable.

See also
List of United States Supreme Court cases, volume 304

External links

United States Supreme Court cases
United States Supreme Court cases of the Hughes Court
1938 in United States case law
United States Twenty-first Amendment case law
Yosemite National Park